Britta Heidemann (born 22 December 1982) is a German épée fencer.
In 2016, Heidemann became a member of the International Olympic Committee (IOC).

Career

Épée Fencing
At the age of 14, already being a successful athlete and swimmer, Britta Heidemann had her first contact with fencing in a variation of modern pentathlon called Friesenkampf. After first switching to modern pentathlon, at the end of 2000, she began to specialize in fencing.

In 2001, she became épée junior world vice-champion and junior European champion. In 2002, she reached third place in the World Fencing Championships, in 2003 second with the team. In 2004, she won third place with the team in the Fencing World Cup. During the 2004 Summer Olympics in Athens, she won the silver medal in the team with Claudia Bokel and Imke Duplitzer.
In 2007, she became world champion in singles in Saint Petersburg and at the 2008 Summer Olympics in Beijing, she won the gold medal in the individual competitions. A year later, in 2009, Heidemann secured the European championship title, thus becoming the first épée fencer to hold all three major titles at once. In 2011, she became German épée champion. Heidemann progressed to the finals of the individual competition of the 2012 Summer Olympics in London (barely beating South Korea's Shin A-lam due to a controversial clock malfunction) and eventually lost to Ukraine's Yana Shemyakina.

Charities
Britta Heidemann donates time to the Bundesliga Foundation, a charity that sponsors health and integration projects. She also supports the EU initiative "Youth on the Move" as well as the campaign "Kinderträume 2011" (child dreams 2011).

Personal life
Heidemann currently lives in Cologne.

See also
 Germany at the 2012 Summer Olympics

Bibliography
 Erfolg ist eine Frage der Haltung: Was Sie vom Fechten für das Leben lernen können., Ariston, München 2011,

References

External links

 
 
 
 
 
 
 Entry in the Who's Who of Leverkusen 

1982 births
Living people
German female fencers
Fencers at the 2004 Summer Olympics
Fencers at the 2008 Summer Olympics
Fencers at the 2012 Summer Olympics
Olympic fencers of Germany
Olympic silver medalists for Germany
Olympic gold medalists for Germany
Olympic medalists in fencing
Sportspeople from Cologne
Medalists at the 2012 Summer Olympics
Medalists at the 2008 Summer Olympics
Medalists at the 2004 Summer Olympics
International Olympic Committee members
European Games competitors for Germany
Fencers at the 2015 European Games
21st-century German women